The 1998–99 Kazakhstan Hockey Championship was the seventh season of the Kazakhstan Hockey Championship, the top level of ice hockey in Kazakhstan. Four teams participated in the league, and Bulat Temirtau won the championship.

Regular season

Final round

Final
Bulat Temirtau 10 Avtomobilist Karagandy 6

3rd place
Amid Rudny 5 Zhenis Astana 4

References
Kazakh Ice Hockey Federation

Kazakhstan Hockey Championship
Kazakhstan Hockey Championship seasons
Kaz